Oberleutnant Erwin Böhme (1879–1917) served under Hauptmann Oswald Boelcke at the same time as Manfred von Richthofen. Böhme scored all of his 24 aerial victories while flying with Jagdstaffel 2 except the first and thirteenth, won while with Kampfstaffel 10 and Jagdstaffel 29 respectively.

The victory list

Confirmed victories in the list are numbered and listed chronologically. An unconfirmed victory is denoted by "u/c". Doubled horizontal lines indicate a change in squadrons by Böhme.

This is a complete listing of all known victories. When casualties for air crews are reported, they are listed pilot first, aerial observers next. Abbreviations in sources were expanded by creating editor.

Sources: Background material from Franks et al. 1993, p. 78. Details were garnered from Franks and Giblin 2003, pp. 9–45.

References

 Norman Franks, Frank W. Bailey, Russell Guest. Above the Lines: The Aces and Fighter Units of the German Air Service, Naval Air Service and Flanders Marine Corps, 1914–1918. Grub Street, 1993. , .
 Norman Franks, Hal Giblin. Under the Guns of the Kaiser's Aces: Böhme, Müller, Von Tutschek and Wolff ; the Complete Record of Their Victories and Victims. Grub Street, 2003. , .

Aerial victories of Böhme, Erwin
Böhme, Erwin